Serdy Ephyfano Rocky Sipolo (born 29 December 2002) is an Indonesian professional footballer who plays as a centre-forward for Liga 2 club Karo United, on loan from Liga 1 club Borneo.

Club career

Bhayangkara FC
Rocky signed with Bhayangkara to play in the Indonesian Liga 2 for the 2020 season. This season was suspended on 27 March 2020 due to the COVID-19 pandemic. The season was abandoned and was declared void on 20 January 2021.

Semen Padang
In 2021, Rocky signed a contract with Indonesian Liga 2 club Semen Padang. He made his league debut on 11 October 2021 in a match against Sriwijaya at the Gelora Sriwijaya Stadium, Palembang. He also scored his first goal for the team in 39th minute.

Borneo
Rocky signed with Borneo to play in the Indonesian Liga 1 for the 2021 season. He made his professional debut on 16 February 2022 in a match against Bhayangkara at the Kapten I Wayan Dipta Stadium, Gianyar.

International career
In November 2019, Rocky was called up to the Indonesia U19 for 2020 AFC U-19 Championship qualification in Indonesia. On 10 November 2019, he debuted in a youth national team when he coming as a starting in a 1–1 draw against North Korea U19 in the 2020 AFC U-19 Championship qualification.

Career statistics

Club

Notes

References

External links
 Serdy Ephyfano at Soccerway
 Serdy Ephyfano at Liga Indonesia

2002 births
Living people
Indonesian footballers
Bhayangkara F.C. players
Borneo F.C. players
Semen Padang F.C. players
PSIM Yogyakarta players
Liga 1 (Indonesia) players
Liga 2 (Indonesia) players
Association football forwards
Sportspeople from North Maluku